Bitter Lemon Press is a small London-based independent publisher, set up by Francois von Hurter in 2003 which specialises in translated literary crime novels and romans noirs from abroad. They currently publish novels by authors such as Gianrico Carofiglio, the famous Swiss crime-writer Friedrich Glauser, Saskia Noort, and the award-winning Cuban writer Leonardo Padura. Several of the novels published have gone on to win or be shortlisted for awards such as the Crime Writers' Association Gold Dagger and the Dublin IMPAC Award . More recently Bitter Lemon has also been publishing books originally in English from such authors as Iain Levison, Elwood Reid and Garry Disher.

References

External links
Bitter Lemon Press website
Consortium Publisher Information

Book publishing companies of the United Kingdom
Small press publishing companies
Publishing companies established in 2003